Morro de Arica is a steep hill located in the Chilean city of Arica. Its height is 139 metres above sea level. It was the last bulwark of defense for the Peruvian troops who garrisoned the city during the War of the Pacific (1879–1883). Morro de Arica was assaulted and captured on June 7, 1880, by Chilean troops in the last part of the Tacna and Arica campaign. Morro de Arica rises steeply from the city and the sea, with a more gentle slope towards the east.  A giant flag of Chile is flown on its summit. Morro de Arica was declared a national monument on October 6, 1971.

References

Landforms of Arica y Parinacota Region
Cliffs of Chile
National Monuments of Chile
Arica
Battlefields
Coasts of Arica y Parinacota Region